Blackwater is a rural village in County Wexford, Ireland.

Transport
Michael Gray operates a route linking the village with Wexford Mondays to Fridays inclusive  Bus Éireann route 379 serves the village on Mondays and Saturdays only linking it to Wexford, Gorey and intermediate locations such as Courtown Harbour.

Amenities
The village has three pubs, Corrigan's, the Blackwater Lodge (which is also a hotel), and Whelan's. It also has a video arcade, a number of supermarkets, a large second-hand furniture store, and a clothes alterations shop.

In the 10 years between the 2006 and 2016 census, the population of the village increased from 173 to 339 people. Blackwater has competed in "category B" (places with populations of between 201 and 1000 people) in the national Tidy Towns competition.

Blackwater is close to Ballyconnigar beach, a site with one of the highest levels of erosion in the area, due to tidal forces. The stretch of beach from Ballyconnigar to Ballynaclash is used for bathing, walking and fishing. Species of fish encountered around this area include bullhuss, smoothhound, tope, bass, ray, codling, eels, and flounder. Other nearby beaches include Curracloe strand and Ballinesker beach, where the opening scene of the film "Saving Private Ryan" was filmed.

Blackwater also has a mobile-home holiday park called 'Abhainn Dubh Mobile home and Leisure Park' which has been open since 1993.

Sports
The local GAA team is St. Brigid's Blackwater, established in 1885. The hurling team play in the Wexford Intermediate Hurling Championship. The Gaelic football team won the 2009 Wexford Junior Championship.

Blackwater has a par 3 golf course which is located outside of the village between Blackwater and Kilmuckridge. The golf course itself was opened in July 1993 although Blackwater Golf Society had its first outing in 1991. Blackwater Golf Course also has a FootGolf course.

In popular culture
Blackwater served as a setting of Mary Kay Tuberty's 2015 novel Keeper of Coin.

Notable people
Michael Cash, stonemason
Colm Tóibín, writer, holidayed here as a child and has a holiday home nearby.

See also
 List of towns and villages in Ireland

References

External links
 Blackwater GAA
 Blackwater Beach fishing info

Towns and villages in County Wexford